Mimi Gstöttner-Auer (1886–1977) was an Austrian stage and film actress. She was the younger sister of Anna Exl and the aunt of Ilse Exl. She was married to the actor Ernst Auer.

On the stage she was generally known for her comedic roles, in contrast to her sister who played tragic characters.

Selected filmography
 The Vulture Wally (1940)
 Ulli and Marei (1948)

References

Bibliography
 Gretl Köfler & Michael Forcher. Die Frau in der Geschichte Tirols. Haymon, 1986.

External links

1886 births
1977 deaths
Actors from Innsbruck
People from the County of Tyrol
Austrian film actresses
Austrian stage actresses